Alan Edgar Stratford Johns (22 September 1925 – 29 January 2002), known as Stratford Johns, was a British stage, film and television actor who is best remembered for his starring role as Detective Inspector Charlie Barlow in the long-running BBC police series Z-Cars.

Early life
Johns was born and grew up in Pietermaritzburg, South Africa. After serving as a deckhand in the South African navy during World War II, he worked for a time in accountancy, but soon became involved in amateur theatre.

Career
In 1948, Johns bought a one-way ticket to Britain and learned his craft working in repertory theatre at Southend-on-Sea for almost five years. He began to appear in British films from the mid-1950s, including a bit part in the classic Ealing comedy The Ladykillers (1955). He ran a small hotel in London during the 1950s, and was a member of the English Stage Company at the Royal Court Theatre during the Angry Young Men period when new playwrights, including John Osborne, introduced new themes to British theatre. His most famous character, Barlow, was noted for his hard edges, owing much to the changes in characterisation pioneered at the Royal Court.

In 1962 he won the part of Barlow in Z-Cars and soon became one of the most familiar and popular faces on British television. During the long run (1962–1965) of Z-Cars, he transferred his character to the spin-off series, Softly, Softly (1966–1969), and later Softly, Softly: Taskforce (1969–1972). He also played the voice of the mysterious "Guvner" in The Great St Trinian's Train Robbery (1966).

He was the subject of This Is Your Life in October 1963 when he was surprised by Eamonn Andrews at BBC Television Centre.

In the 1970s he starred in a third spin-off series, Barlow at Large (1971,1973), which saw the character transferred to British Intelligence: it was later retitled simply Barlow (1974–1975). Although the Barlow character remained popular (and appeared in another spin-off, in which he investigated the Jack the Ripper murders), ratings for these solo spin-offs declined, and the final series ended in 1975. Barlow was seen once more in 1976, in the series Second Verdict.

Johns appeared as President of the Council Bradshaw in the 1970 award-winning film Cromwell with Richard Harris in the role of Cromwell and Sir Alec Guinness as King Charles I.

In 1973 Johns was named BBC TV Personality of the Year by the Variety Club of Great Britain. He portrayed the apartheid-supporting Namib mine superintendent Mr. Zimmerman in two episodes of the 1985 mini-series Master of the Game.

Johns later appeared in the Ken Russell films Salome's Last Dance and The Lair of the White Worm (both 1988), followed by the title-character in the mid-1980s Channel 4 series Brond.

His many stage credits include Daddy Warbucks in the original West End run of Annie – he can be heard on the original London cast album – and the Ghost of Christmas Present in the original Birmingham cast of the stage adaptation of the film musical Scrooge (1970), on the recording of which he can also be heard. His guest appearances on TV include The Avengers, Department S, Neverwhere, the Doctor Who serial Four to Doomsday (1982) and the Blake's 7 episode "Games". He had a prominent role as Calpurnius Piso in the BBC's acclaimed adaptation of Robert Graves' I, Claudius (1976); he played Magwitch in the BBC's 1981 adaptation of Dickens' Great Expectations, and the jailer in The Secret Life of Albie Sachs. Johns appeared in the 1984 pop video for Young at Heart recorded by The Bluebells. With him were veteran Scottish actress Molly Weir and Scots singer/actress Clare Grogan. In 1993, Johns appeared in the BBC period drama Scarlet and Black alongside a young Ewan McGregor and Rachel Weisz.

Johns played the role of Cyril Isaiah Greengrass, the conniving brother of Claude Jeremiah Greengrass in the nostalgic Yorkshire Television series, Heartbeat.

He was also the author of the children's book Gumphlumph; in the mid-1960s, at the height of his fame as Barlow, he read it on the children's television series Jackanory. Gumphlumph would be revived, again with Johns narrating, for the TV-am children's programme Rub-a-Dub-Tub in the 1980s.

Personal life
He married Nanette Ryder in 1955; they had four children. He ran the small hotel in St Martins Lane called the St Martins Hotel; it was managed by Elizabeth Kissick-Jones, formerly Hartnell, who was the aunt of his wife Nanette. The hotel was very popular with actors and he ran it until 1976.

After several years of poor health, Johns died from heart disease in 2002, aged 76.

Selected filmography

 Burnt Evidence (1954) - 2nd Fireman (uncredited)
 The Night My Number Came Up (1955) - Sergeant (uncredited)
 The Ship That Died of Shame (1955) - Garage Worker (uncredited)
 The Ladykillers (1955) - Security Guard (uncredited)
 Who Done It? (1956) - P.C. Coleman
 Women Without Men (1956) - 1st Reveller (uncredited)
 The Long Arm (1956) - Constable (uncredited)
 Tiger in the Smoke (1956) - Police Constable
 Across the Bridge (1957) - Detective in Schaffner's Office (uncredited)
 The One That Got Away (1957) - Second Detective (uncredited)
 Violent Playground (1958) - (uncredited)
 Indiscreet (1958) - Waiter (uncredited)
 Law and Disorder (1958) - Driver of Prison Van (uncredited)
 A Night to Remember (1958) - Crewman on Upturned Lifeboat (uncredited)
 The Professionals (1960) - Lawson
 Hand in Hand (1960)
 Two Letter Alibi (1962)- Bates
 The Great St Trinian's Train Robbery (1966) - The Voice (voice)
 Rocket to the Moon (1967) - Warrant Officer
 The Plank (1967) - Warrant Officer
 Cromwell (1970) - President Bradshaw
 The Strange Case of the End of Civilization as We Know It (1977) - Chief Commissioner Blocker
 The Fiendish Plot of Dr. Fu Manchu (1980) - Ismail
 George and Mildred (1980) - Harry Pinto
 Master of the Game (1984) - Zimmerman
 Dance with a Stranger (1985) - Morrie Conley
 Wild Geese II (1985) - Mustapha El Ali
 Car Trouble (1986) - Reg Sampson
 Foreign Body (1986) - Mr. Plumb
 Brond (1987) - Brond
 Salome's Last Dance (1988) - Herod / Alfred Taylor
 The Lair of the White Worm (1988) - Peters
 The Fool (1990) - Arthur Shillibeer
 The Secret Agent (1992) - The Home Secretary
 Splitting Heirs (1993) - Butler
 Minder (TV series) (1994)- Knowles
 Heartbeat'' (British TV series) Cyril Isiah Greengrass (1998)

References

External links

Stratford Johns at the British Film Institute

1925 births
2002 deaths
People from Pietermaritzburg
South African military personnel of World War II
South African male film actors
South African male stage actors
South African male television actors
South African emigrants to the United Kingdom
English male film actors
English male stage actors
English male television actors